CPSU is the Communist Party of the Soviet Union, the sole governing party of the Soviet Union until 1990.

CPSU may also refer to:

Schools
 California Polytechnic State University, San Luis Obispo, California, USA
 Central Philippines State University, Negros Occidental, Philippines
 Coventry Polytechnic Students Union, England

Organizations
 Central Public Sector Undertaking, a state-owned enterprise in India
 Civil and Public Services Union, an Irish trade union
 Commonwealth Policy Studies Unit, a think tank in London
 Communist Party of Social Justice, political party in Russia established in 2012
 Communist Party of the Soviet Union (1992)
 Communist Party of the Soviet Union (2001)
 Community and Public Sector Union, an Australian trade union
 Union of Communist Parties – Communist Party of the Soviet Union